Bhajarangi 2 is an Indian Kannada-language fantasy action film written and directed by Harsha, and produced by Jayanna-Bogendra under the banner of Jayanna Combines. It stars Shiva Rajkumar, Bhavana and Cheluvaraj in the lead roles, while Kuri Prathap, Dusyanth Rai, Saurav Lokesh, Prakash Thuminad and Shruthi appear in supporting roles. 

The film was released theatrically on 29 October 2021 and received mixed-to-positive reviews from critics.

Plot 
Araka, a tribesman makes money by producing drugs from Ayurvedic plants, found in his territory and selling them. Sudheendra, a priest, is performing penance since many years, with the help of a sage.

One day, a seller buys drugs from Araka and the drugs earns him a profit. The seller provides to him. He asks Araka for a truckload of drugs to sell, but Araka's assistant tells him that it is not easy to produce them due to the shortage of labour. The seller advises them that there are many people in the nearby villages, who can be kidnapped for labor. While celebrating a festival, the villagers are suddenly attacked and captured by Araka's men. Anji tries to stop him as his sister Alamelamma and girlfriend Chinminiki are also captured, but is beaten and thrown out of the village by Araka. 

Araka's assistant stops him, where Araka gets enraged and decapitates his assistant. Araka takes all the captured villagers. Anji gets dejected about failing to save the villagers from Araka, and commits suicide in Sudheendra's cave. Suddenly, a supernatural force from the sky arrives, where the sage notices the sky and takes Anji's soul. It is revealed that Araka once had a enemy in the form of Bhajarangi, a forest officer and Anji doppelgänger. Bhajarangi had freed the tyranny rule of Araka's father Jagrava by killing him, due to which Araka poisoned the village and killed his own tribesman due to having betrayed Jagrava and joined Bhajarangi in the first place. 

Anji's body is now taken to Sudheendra where he lets Bhajarangi's soul possess Anji and heads to finish Araka. Anji/Bhajarangi arrives at Araka's den and finishes him off. Bhajarangi tells Sudheendra to spread about the awareness of Ayurveda, to which he agrees. Sudheendra provides his knowledge to Anji and dies, where Anji reviews and continues Sudheendra's mission.

Cast 
Shiva Rajkumar as Bhajarangi and Aanji (dual role)
Bhavana as Chinminiki 
Shruthi as Alamelamma
Saurav Lokesh as Sudheendra, companion of Bhajarangi, later became powerful priest by help of Sage
 Shivraj K. R. Pete as Chinminki's assistant
 Cheluvaraj as Araka, Jagrava's son
 Prasanna Baagin as Jaagrava, head of Kiraki dynasty
 Vajragiri as Sage 
 Babu Hirannayya as doctor
 Veena Ponnappa as lady doctor
 Papa Pandu Shalini as Hoovamma, Bride
 Prakash Thuminad as Alamelamma's husband
 Kuri Prathap as Baddi, assistant in Alamelamma's house

Production
In October 2017, Harsha announced "Raana" with Yash amidst much fanfare. But Yash was not too happy with the script that Harsha had presented to him. Sources add that when Harsha presented the actor with the complete script, he wasn't too happy and had reportedly told the director to fine-tune it to meet his approval standards. Further, with the director's track record not being up to scratch, Yash's well-wishers reportedly advised him to put Raana in cold storage for the time being. Harsha replaced Yash with Shivrajkumar in the movie and eventually, renamed the movie as "Bhajarangi 2"

Release
The film was initially slated to release on 10 September but was postponed due to COVID-19 pandemic. Then it was scheduled to be released on 29 October 2021, but again got cancelled due to the death of Shiva Rajkumar's brother Puneeth.

Reception
Bhajarangi 2 received mixed to positive reviews from critics. 

Kiran R. Hemmige of The News Minute gave 2 out of 5 stars and wrote "While Shiva Rajkumar has given it his all as usual, the film lacks logic and is let down by its one-dimensional characters."

Jagadish Angadi of Deccan Herald gave 3 out of 5 stars and wrote "The narrative technique in the flashback is likely to confuse the audience. The director appears to have lost control over the plot throughout the first half. Several scenes delay the story from taking off. In the second half, the pace falters."

Music 
Arjun Janya composed the music for the film.

References

External links
 
Nee Sigoovaregu
 

Films scored by Arjun Janya
Films shot in Bangalore
Films shot in Karnataka
Indian sequel films
2020s masala films